George Edward Moore  (4 November 1873 – 24 October 1958) was an English philosopher, who with Bertrand Russell, Ludwig Wittgenstein and earlier Gottlob Frege was among the founders of analytic philosophy. He and Russell led the turn from idealism in British philosophy and became known for advocating common-sense concepts and contributing to ethics, epistemology and metaphysics. He was said to have an "exceptional personality and moral character". Ray Monk later dubbed him "the most revered philosopher of his era". 

As Professor of Philosophy at the University of Cambridge, he influenced but abstained from the Bloomsbury Group. He edited the journal Mind. He was a member of the Cambridge Apostles from 1894 to 1901, a fellow of the British Academy from 1918, and chaired the Cambridge University Moral Sciences Club in 1912–1944. As a humanist, he presided over the British Ethical Union (now Humanists UK) in 1935–1936.

Life
George Edward Moore was born in Upper Norwood, in south-east London, on 4 November 1873, the middle child of seven of Daniel Moore, a medical doctor, and Henrietta Sturge. His grandfather was the author George Moore. His eldest brother was Thomas Sturge Moore, a poet, writer and engraver.

He was educated at Dulwich College and, in 1892, went up to Trinity College, Cambridge, to read classics and moral sciences. He became a Fellow of Trinity in 1898 and went on to hold the University of Cambridge chair of Mental Philosophy and Logic from 1925 to 1939.

Moore is best known today for defending ethical non-naturalism, his emphasis on common sense in philosophical method, and the paradox that bears his name. He was admired by and influenced other philosophers and the Bloomsbury Group. But unlike his colleague and admirer Russell, who for some years thought Moore fulfilled his "ideal of genius", he is mostly unknown today outside of academic philosophy. Moore's essays are known for their clarity and circumspection of writing style and methodical and patient approach to philosophical problems. He was critical of modern philosophy for lack of progress, which he saw as a stark contrast to the dramatic advances in the natural sciences since the Renaissance. Among Moore's most famous works are his Principia Ethica, and his essays, "The Refutation of Idealism", "A Defence of Common Sense", and "A Proof of the External World".

Moore was an important and admired member of the secretive Cambridge Apostles, a discussion group drawn from the British intellectual elite.  At the time another member, a 22-year-old Bertrand Russell, wrote, "I almost worship him as if he were a god. I have never felt such an extravagant admiration for anybody", and would later write that "for some years he fulfilled my ideal of genius. He was in those days beautiful and slim, with a look almost of inspiration as deeply passionate as Spinoza's".

From 1918 to 1919, Moore chaired the Aristotelian Society, a group committed to systematic study of philosophy, its historical development and its methods and problems.

Moore died at the Evelyn Nursing Home on 24 October 1958. He was cremated at Cambridge Crematorium on 28 October 1958 and his ashes interred at the Parish of the Ascension Burial Ground in the city. His wife, Dorothy Ely (1892–1977), was buried there. Together, they had two sons, the poet Nicholas Moore and the composer Timothy Moore.

Philosophy

Ethics

His influential work Principia Ethica is one of the main inspirations of the movement against ethical naturalism (see ethical non-naturalism) and is partly responsible for the twentieth-century concern with meta-ethics.

The naturalistic fallacy

Moore asserted that philosophical arguments can suffer from a confusion between the use of a term in a particular argument and the definition of that term (in all arguments). He named this confusion the naturalistic fallacy. For example, an ethical argument may claim that if a thing has certain properties, then that thing is 'good.' A hedonist may argue that 'pleasant' things are 'good' things. Other theorists may argue that 'complex' things are 'good' things. Moore contends that, even if such arguments are correct, they do not provide definitions for the term 'good'. The property of 'goodness' cannot be defined. It can only be shown and grasped. Any attempt to define it (X is good if it has property Y) will simply shift the problem (Why is Y-ness good in the first place?).

Open-question argument

Moore's argument for the indefinability of 'good' (and thus for the fallaciousness in the "naturalistic fallacy") is often called the open-question argument; it is presented in §13 of Principia Ethica. The argument hinges on the nature of statements such as "Anything that is pleasant is also good" and the possibility of asking questions such as "Is it good that x is pleasant?". According to Moore, these questions are open and these statements are significant; and they will remain so no matter what is substituted for "pleasure". Moore concludes from this that any analysis of value is bound to fail. In other words, if value could be analysed, then such questions and statements would be trivial and obvious. Since they are anything but trivial and obvious, value must be indefinable.

Critics of Moore's arguments sometimes claim that he is appealing to general puzzles concerning analysis (cf. the paradox of analysis), rather than revealing anything special about value. The argument clearly depends on the assumption that if 'good' were definable, it would be an analytic truth about 'good', an assumption that many contemporary moral realists like Richard Boyd and Peter Railton reject.  Other responses appeal to the Fregean distinction between sense and reference, allowing that value concepts are special and sui generis, but insisting that value properties are nothing but natural properties (this strategy is similar to that taken by non-reductive materialists in philosophy of mind).

Good as indefinable
Moore contended that goodness cannot be analysed in terms of any other property. In Principia Ethica, he writes:

 It may be true that all things which are good are also something else, just as it is true that all things which are yellow produce a certain kind of vibration in the light. And it is a fact, that Ethics aims at discovering what are those other properties belonging to all things which are good. But far too many philosophers have thought that when they named those other properties they were actually defining good; that these properties, in fact, were simply not "other," but absolutely and entirely the same with goodness. (Principia, § 10 ¶ 3)

Therefore, we cannot define 'good' by explaining it in other words. We can only point to a thing or an action and say "That is good." Similarly, we cannot describe to a person born totally blind exactly what yellow is. We can only show a sighted person a piece of yellow paper or a yellow scrap of cloth and say "That is yellow."

Good as a non-natural property
In addition to categorising 'good' as indefinable, Moore also emphasized that it is a non-natural property. This means that it cannot be empirically or scientifically tested or verifiedit is not within the bounds of "natural science".

Moral knowledge
Moore argued that, once arguments based on the naturalistic fallacy had been discarded, questions of intrinsic goodness could be settled only by appeal to what he (following Sidgwick) called "moral intuitions": self-evident propositions which recommend themselves to moral reflection, but which are not susceptible to either direct proof or disproof (Principia, § 45). As a result of his view, he has often been described by later writers as an advocate of ethical intuitionism. Moore, however, wished to distinguish his view from the views usually described as "Intuitionist" when Principia Ethica was written:

Moore distinguished his view from the view of deontological intuitionists, who held that "intuitions" could determine questions about what actions are right or required by duty. Moore, as a consequentialist, argued that "duties" and moral rules could be determined by investigating the effects of particular actions or kinds of actions (Principia, § 89), and so were matters for empirical investigation rather than direct objects of intuition (Prncipia, § 90). On Moore's view, "intuitions" revealed not the rightness or wrongness of specific actions, but only what things were good in themselves, as ends to be pursued.

Right action, duty and virtue 
Moore holds that  are those producing the most good. The difficulty with this is that the consequences of most actions are too vast for us to properly take into account, especially the long-term consequences. Because of this, Moore suggests that the definition of duty is limited to what generally produces better results than probable alternatives in a comparatively near future. Whether a given rule of action turns out to be a duty depends to some extent on the conditions of the corresponding society but duties agree mostly with what common-sense recommends. Virtues, like honesty, can in turn be defined as permanent dispositions to perform duties.

Proof of an external world

One of the most important parts of Moore's philosophical development was his break from the idealism that dominated British philosophy (as represented in the works of his former teachers F. H. Bradley and John McTaggart), and his defence of what he regarded as a "common sense" form of realism. In his 1925 essay "A Defence of Common Sense", he argued against idealism and scepticism toward the external world, on the grounds that they could not give reasons to accept that their metaphysical premises were more plausible than the reasons we have for accepting the common sense claims about our knowledge of the world, which sceptics and idealists must deny. He famously put the point into dramatic relief with his 1939 essay "Proof of an External World", in which he gave a common sense argument against scepticism by raising his right hand and saying "Here is one hand" and then raising his left and saying "And here is another", then concluding that there are at least two external objects in the world, and therefore that he knows (by this argument) that an external world exists. Not surprisingly, not everyone inclined to sceptical doubts found Moore's method of argument entirely convincing; Moore, however, defends his argument on the grounds that sceptical arguments seem invariably to require an appeal to "philosophical intuitions" that we have considerably less reason to accept than we have for the common sense claims that they supposedly refute. (In addition to fueling Moore's own work, the "Here is one hand" argument also deeply influenced Wittgenstein, who spent his last years working out a new approach to Moore's argument in the remarks that were published posthumously as On Certainty.)

Moore's paradox
Moore is also remembered for drawing attention to the peculiar inconsistency involved in uttering a sentence such as "It is raining, but I do not believe it is raining", a puzzle now commonly called "Moore's paradox". The puzzle arises because it seems impossible for anyone to consistently assert such a sentence; but there doesn't seem to be any logical contradiction between "It is raining" and "I don't believe that it is raining", because the former is a statement about the weather and the latter a statement about a person's belief about the weather, and it is perfectly logically possible that it may rain whilst a person does not believe that it is raining.

In addition to Moore's own work on the paradox, the puzzle also inspired a great deal of work by Ludwig Wittgenstein, who described the paradox as the most impressive philosophical insight that Moore had ever introduced. It is said that when Wittgenstein first heard this paradox one evening (which Moore had earlier stated in a lecture), he rushed round to Moore's lodgings, got him out of bed and insisted that Moore repeat the entire lecture to him.

Organic wholes
Moore's description of the principle of the organic whole is extremely straightforward, nonetheless, and a variant on a pattern that began with Aristotle:

 The value of a whole must not be assumed to be the same as the sum of the values of its parts (Principia, § 18).

According to Moore, a moral actor cannot survey the 'goodness' inherent in the various parts of a situation, assign a value to each of them, and then generate a sum in order to get an idea of its total value. A moral scenario is a complex assembly of parts, and its total value is often created by the relations between those parts, and not by their individual value. The organic metaphor is thus very appropriate: biological organisms seem to have emergent properties which cannot be found anywhere in their individual parts. For example, a human brain seems to exhibit a capacity for thought when none of its neurons exhibit any such capacity. In the same way, a moral scenario can have a value far greater than the sum of its component parts.

To understand the application of the organic principle to questions of value, it is perhaps best to consider Moore's primary example, that of a consciousness experiencing a beautiful object. To see how the principle works, a thinker engages in "reflective isolation", the act of isolating a given concept in a kind of null-context and determining its intrinsic value. In our example, we can easily see that, of themselves, beautiful objects and consciousnesses are not particularly valuable things. They might have some value, but when we consider the total value of a consciousness experiencing a beautiful object, it seems to exceed the simple sum of these values.  Hence the value of a whole must not be assumed to be the same as the sum of the values of its parts.

Works

 G. E. Moore, "The Nature of Judgment" (1899)
 

 G. E. Moore, Principia Ethica (1903)
 G. E. Moore, "Review of Franz Brentano's The Origin of the Knowledge of Right and Wrong" (1903)
 G. E. Moore, "The Refutation of Idealism" (1903)
 
 G. E. Moore, "The Nature and Reality of the Objects of Perception" (1905–6)
 
 
 G. E. Moore, Ethics (1912)
 G. E. Moore, "Some Judgments of Perception" (1918)
 G. E. Moore, Philosophical Studies (1922) [papers published 1903–21]
 G. E. Moore, "The Conception of Intrinsic Value"
 G. E. Moore, "The Nature of Moral Philosophy"
 G. E. Moore, "Are the Characteristics of Things Universal or Particular?" (1923)
 G. E. Moore, "A Defence of Common Sense" (1925)
 G. E. Moore and F. P. Ramsey, Facts and Proposition (Symposium) (1927)
 W. Kneale and G. E. Moore, "Symposium: Is Existence a Predicate?" (1936)
 G. E. Moore, "An Autobiography," and "A reply to my critics," in: The Philosophy Of G. E. Moore. ed. Schilpp, Paul Arthur (1942).
 G. E. Moore, Some Main Problems of Philosophy (1953) [lectures delivered 1910–11]
 G. E. Moore, Ch. 3, "Propositions"
 G. E. Moore, Philosophical Papers (1959)
 G. E. Moore, Ch. 7: "Proof of an External World"
 "Margin Notes by G. E. Moore on The Works of Thomas Reid (1849: With Notes by Sir William Hamilton)".
 G. E. Moore, The Early Essays, edited by Tom Regan, Temple University Press (1986).
 G. E. Moore, The Elements of Ethics, edited and with an introduction by Tom Regan, Temple University Press, (1991).
 G. E. Moore, 'On Defining "Good,'" in Analytic Philosophy: Classic Readings, Stamford, CT: Wadsworth, 2002, pp. 1–10. .

See also
 The Right and the Good

References

Further reading
 
 
 Daval, René. Moore et la philosophie analytique, 1997, Presses Universitaires de France (PUF), 
 Regan, Tom (1986). Bloomsbury's Prophet: G.E. Moore and the Development of His Moral Philosophy, Temple University Press.

External links

 George Edward Moore – philosophypages.com
 The Stanford Encyclopedia of Philosophy
 George Edward Moore
 Moore's Moral Philosophy
 
 
 
 Trinity College Chapel
 G. E. Moore and the Cambridge School of Analysis, Thomas Baldwin, The Oxford Handbook of The History of Analytic Philosophy
 Open Access papers by Moore published in Proceedings of the Aristotelian Society and Aristotelian Society Supplementary Volume.

1873 births
1958 deaths
19th-century British philosophers
19th-century British writers
19th-century English philosophers
19th-century English writers
20th-century British philosophers
20th-century British writers
20th-century English writers
Alumni of Trinity College, Cambridge
Analytic philosophers
Aristotelian philosophers
British agnostics
British ethicists
Cambridge University Moral Sciences Club
Consequentialists
English humanists
English logicians
Epistemologists
Fellows of the British Academy
Fellows of Trinity College, Cambridge
Linguistic turn
Members of the Order of Merit
Metaphysicians
Moral realists
Ontologists
People educated at Dulwich College
Philosophers of culture
Philosophers of education
Philosophers of language
Philosophers of logic
Philosophers of mind
Presidents of the Aristotelian Society
Victorian writers
People from the London Borough of Southwark
Mind (journal) editors
Bertrand Russell Professors of Philosophy